Hundred of Parsons may refer to:
 Hundred of Parsons (South Australia)
 Hundred of Parsons (Northern Territory)